Universidad Alas Peruanas (UAP or Peruvian Wings University) is a university located in Lima, Peru, founded on April 26, 1996, by Joaquin Ramirez thorough an Cooperativa Alas Peruanas, composed of members of the Peruvian Armed Forces.

In January 2014, the school launched UAPSat-1, a satellite that monitors the environment outside the earth's atmosphere aboard the Cygnus CRS Orb-1 mission.

History

The creation of the Alas Peruanas University was the idea of Dr. Fidel Ramírez Prado (Doctor of Education from the National University of San Marcos, with specialization courses in Spain, Canada, the United States, Panama, Israel, England and Mexico), who in March 1989 received the support of the delegates of the Alas Peruanas Cooperative General Assembly to proceed with such an ambitious project. 
After almost seven years and long periods of paperwork, on April 26, 1996, by Resolution No. 102 the creation of the Universidad Alas Peruanas was authorised. Its first Rector was Mr. Fidel Ramírez Prado. 
The Universidad Alas Peruanas opened on June 1, 1996, with five professional courses in the Jesús María district. 
At present, it has 20 national branches and 34 professional courses of studies.

Alas Peruanas International 
The Universidad Alas Peruanas promotes the exchange of knowledge and research at the international level in all its academic areas at undergraduate and graduate levels as well as for its teaching staff. The aim is to create and multiply relations with prestigious foreign institutions, among others: 
 Universidad Estatal del Valle de Ecatepec (UNEVE).
 Universidad de Mendoza – Argentina.
 Universidad del Golfo México.

University Directory

University Authorities 
Cpc.José E. Castillo Carazas
 CEO
Dr. Francisco Luis Pérez Expósito
 Rector
Dr. Ricardo Díaz Bazán, Ph. D.
 Academic Vice-Rector – Vice-Rector of Research, Innovation and Entrepreneurship
Oscar Lagravère Von Massenbach, Ph. D.
 Dean, School of Engineering and Architecture
Oswaldo J. Vasquez Cerna, Ph. D.
 Dean, School of Business Sciences and Education
Dr. Iván M. Vojvodic Hernández
 Dean, School of Medicine and Health Sciences
Dr. Jesús M. Galarza Orrilla
 Dean, School of Law and Political Sciences
Mg. Walter R. Tasayco Alcántara
 Dean.  School of Agricultural Sciences

Schools and Courses

Graduate school  
Master's Degree

Second specialization

Alas Peruanas Network 
University 

With headquarters in the city of Lima, it also has several branches and Decentralized Academic Units throughout the country.

 Branches: Abancay, Andahuaylas, Arequipa, Ayacucho, Cajamarca, Chiclayo, Cusco, Huacho, Huancayo, Huánuco, Ica, Jaén, Juliaca, Piura, Pucallpa, Puerto Maldonado, Tacna, Tarapoto and Tumbes.

The Alas Peruanas Cooperative

The savings and credit-type cooperative was set up on December 14, 1968, and officially recognized by Resolution No. 053-69 of the National Institute of Cooperatives (INCOOP) on March 11, 1969, and duly registered in Lima's Public Registry  on Volume I, Entry 1 Folio 429, in accordance with Legislative Decree No. 085, obtaining its compliance certification from the INCOOP on July 7, 1982, having been registered on Volume II, Entry 5, page 531 of the Cooperatives Records of  the Public Registry of Lima.
Dr. Fidel Ramírez Prado, currently general manager and rector of the Universidad Alas Peruanas, was the great driving force behind the cooperative for many years, having led it to its present position.

CEPRE UAP

The Pre-University Centre Universidad Alas Peruanas (CEPRE - UAP) is a dynamic institution, part of the Peruvian University System that offers direct admission to the 6 schools and their 30 courses to students who satisfactorily pass the Admission Course. A quality education and good values formation are the base of our country's future.

Institutes

They are educational institutions of higher education promoted by the Universidad Alas Peruanas, with the purpose of forming technical professionals in accordance with the current Technological Superior Education Institutes and Schools Act (MODULAR system) using state-of-the-art equipment and experienced scholars in the teaching and learning process.

Branches:
 Lima
 Piura
 Ica
 Arequipa
 Chincha
 Chiclayo

I.E.P. "Alas Peruanas" (Colleges)

It has three branches:

 Arequipa
 Chiclayo
 https://www.uap.edu.pe/filiales/filial-ica/

Notable alumni 
Liz Benavides (born 1969), lawyer, Peru's attorney general

References

External links  

Facebook: https://www.facebook.com/ComunidadUAP.oficial/  
Instagram: @uap.oficial

Educational institutions established in 1996
Universities in Lima
1996 establishments in Peru